Korea University Sejong Campus is Korea University's second campus. It was established in Jochiwon, Yeongi County(later annexed to Jochiwon District of Sejong City, the governmental capital of South Korea), South Korea in 1980. Korea University Sejong Campus is a leading research oriented one. The campus consists of the Biomedical Campus in Osong Bio-health technopolis established by Korea's Ministry of Health & Welfare, New Research Campus (provisional name) in Sejong City which is established as Korea's new government district (Sejong Special Self-Governing City) Six colleges and schools in Sejong Campus are part of the twenty schools of Korea University.

History
The installation plan of Korea University Sejong Campus was approved on September 22 in 1979.

Academics

Colleges and schools
 College of Public Policy
 College of Science and Technology
 College of Business and Economics
 School of Public Administration
 School of Sports and Leisure Studies
 College of Pharmacy
 Division of Smart Cities

References

External links
 sejong.korea.ac.kr
 Korea University Library

Korea University
Universities and colleges in Sejong City